Chahar Zabar-e Sofla (also Romanized as Chahār Zabar-e Soflá; also known as Chahār Zabar-e ‘Alīnaqī Khānī, Chahār Zabar-e Pā'īn, Chahār Zebr-e Pā’īn, and Chehār Zabar) is a village in Mahidasht Rural District, Mahidasht District, Kermanshah County, Kermanshah Province, Iran. At the 2006 census, its population was 356, in 76 families.

References 

Populated places in Kermanshah County